A corrole is an aromatic  tetrapyrrole.  The corrin ring is also present in cobalamin (vitamin B12). The ring consists of nineteen carbon atoms, with four nitrogen atoms in the core of the molecule.  In this sense, corrole is very similar to porphyrin.

Preparation
Corroles can be prepared by a two-step process, beginning with the condensation reaction of a benzaldehyde with pyrrole.  The open-ring product, a bilane (or tetrapyrrane), is cyclized by oxidation, typically with p-chloranil:

Comparison with porphyrins
Corrole and porphyrins differ in several ways.  Corroles are triprotic, whereas porphyrins are diprotic.  Because of the 3- charge of the triply deprotonated ligand, metallocorroles are formally high-valent.  Several are redox-noninnocent, with a corrole radical-dianion ligand. A second difference between corroles and porphyrins is the size of the metal-binding cavity, i.e., 17- vs 18-membered rings.  See "Porphyrins and similar compounds" in Conjugated systems for more about these side by side images of porphyrin, chlorin, and corrin structures:

Coordination complexes
Corroles have been attached to a wide range of transition metals, main group elements, and lanthanides, actinides. and the diprotonated, neutral corrole radical.  Additionally, corroles and their metal complexes have been demonstrated to be useful as imaging agents in tumor detection, oxygen sensing, for prevention of heart disease,  in synthetic chemistry as oxo, imido, and nitrido transfer agents, and as catalysts for the catalytic reduction of oxygen to water, and hydrogen production form water under aerobic conditions.

Protein-corrole particles have been investigated as carriers of theranostic cargo for tumor targeting.

References

Chelating agents
Tetrapyrroles
Macrocycles